Stara Planina ski resort or Stara Planina ski center is a mountain resort and one of the largest centers of winter tourism in Serbia, operated by public company "Skijališta Srbije". Located on the slopes of Stara Planina, it is mainly a destination for skiing.

History
In 2008, the Ministry of Economy announced its plan to invest around 240 million euros over eight years in Stara Planina ski resort. However, much of the plan has never been realized, with only some of the investments being realized over 10 years.

Features
It is located at elevations between 1,100 and 1,900 meters. It has six tracks having  in total, with some of them covered by artificial snowing systems, with the total capacity of the about 2,600 skiers per hour. It is equipped with modern chairlifts, with total capacity of 2,400 skiers per hour. All tracks are categorized by the International Ski Federation (FIS).

Transportation
Stara Planina ski resort is located some 55 kilometers from the city of Pirot, 70 kilometers from the city of Niš and international airport Niš Constantine the Great Airport.

Gallery

See also
 Tourism in Serbia

References

External links

 
 Ski resort Stara Planina at skiresort.info
 Stara Planina ski resort at skibus.rs 

Ski areas and resorts in Serbia
Balkan mountains